A European Union Association Agreement or simply Association Agreement (AA) is a treaty between the European Union (EU), its Member States and a non-EU country that creates a framework for co-operation between them. Areas frequently covered by such agreements include the development of political, trade, social, cultural and security links. 

Association Agreements are broad framework agreements between the EU (or its predecessors) and its member states, and an external state which governs their bilateral relations. The provision for an association agreement was included in the Treaty of Rome, which established the European Economic Community, as a means to enable co-operation of the Community with the United Kingdom, which had retreated from the treaty negotiations at the Messina Conference of 1955.  According to the European External Action Service, for an agreement to be classified as an AA, it must meet several criteria:

The EU typically concludes Association Agreements in exchange for commitments to political, economic, trade, or human rights reform in a country.  In exchange, the country may be offered tariff-free access to some or all EU markets (industrial goods, agricultural products, etc.), and financial or technical assistance. Most recently signed AAs also include a Free Trade Agreement (FTA) between the EU and the third country.

Association Agreements have to be accepted by the European Union and need to be ratified by all the EU member states and the state concerned.

Names and types
AAs go by a variety of names (e.g. Euro-Mediterranean Agreement Establishing an Association, Europe Agreement Establishing an Association) and need not necessarily even have the word "Association" in the title. Some AAs contain a promise of future EU membership for the contracting state.

The first states to sign such agreements were Greece in 1961 and Turkey in 1963.

In recent history, such agreements have been signed as part of two EU policies, the Stabilisation and Association Process (SAp) and the European Neighbourhood Policy (ENP).

The countries of the western Balkans (official candidates Albania, Montenegro, North Macedonia, Serbia, and potential candidates Bosnia and Herzegovina and Kosovo) are covered by SAp. All six have "Stabilisation and Association Agreements" (SAA) with the EU in force.

The Eastern European neighbours of Armenia, Azerbaijan, Belarus, Georgia, Moldova, and Ukraine are all members of the Eastern Partnership and are covered by the ENP. While Russia has a special status with the EU-Russia Common Spaces instead of ENP participation.

Meanwhile, the countries of the Mediterranean, (Algeria, Morocco, Egypt, Israel, Jordan, Lebanon, Libya, the Palestinian Authority, Syria, Tunisia) are also covered by the ENP and seven of the Mediterranean states have a "Euro-Mediterranean Agreement establishing an Association" (EMAA) with the EU in force, while Palestine has an interim EMAA in force. Syria initialed an EMAA in 2008, however signing has been deferred indefinitely. Negotiations for a Framework Agreement with the remaining state, Libya, have been suspended.

Moldova and Ukraine have Association Agreements in force. Armenia completed negotiations for a AA in 2013 but decided not to sign the agreement and later signed a revised CEPA with the EU in 2017.  Azerbaijan was also negotiating an AA, but did not conclude one.

Both the SAA and ENP are based mostly on the EU's acquis communautaire and its promulgation in the co-operating states legislation. Of course, the depth of the harmonisation is less than full EU members and some policy areas may not be covered (depending on the particular state).

In addition to these two policies, AAs with free-trade agreement provisions have been signed with other states and trade blocs including Chile and South Africa.

EU Agreements with third states

Association Agreements

In force
 ACP PA (2003)
 Albania SAA (2009)
 Algeria EMAA (2005)
 Bosnia and Herzegovina SAA (2015)
 Chile AA (2005)
 Egypt EMAA (2004)
 Georgia AA (2016)
 Iceland EEA (1994)
 Israel EMAA (2000)
 Jordan EMAA (2002)
 Kosovo* SAA (2016)
 Lebanon EMAA (2006)
 Liechtenstein EEA (1995)
 Moldova AA (2016)
 Montenegro SAA (2010)
 Morocco EMAA (2000)
 North Macedonia SAA (2004)
 Norway EEA (1994)
 Serbia SAA (2013)
 South Africa ATDC (2004)
 Syria CA (1978; cooperation programmes suspended in 2011)
 Tunisia EMAA (1998)
 Turkey AA (1964) the framework for a CU (1995)
 Ukraine AA (2017)
 United Kingdom: TCA (2021)

Currently pending ratification

 Central America: European Union Central American Association Agreement (signed in 2012)

Currently in negotiations

 Andorra AA
 Libya (negotiations for a Framework Agreement were launched in 2008, but suspended in 2011 due to the Libyan Civil War; as of 2014 the EU is seeking to re-launch the negotiations)
 Mercosur AA
 Monaco AA
 San Marino AA
 Syria EMAA (initialled in 2008, however signing has been stalled indefinitely by the EU due to concerns over the conduct of Syrian authorities during anti-government protests in 2011 and the ensuing civil war)

Defunct agreements
African states Convention of Association (1964, 1971), superseded by another Convention in 1976
 ACP Convention (1976, 1981, 1986, 1991), superseded by PA in 2003
 Bulgaria EAA (1995), acceded to the EU in 2007
 Croatia SAA (2005), acceded to the EU in 2013
 Cyprus AA (1973), acceded to the EU in 2004
 Czech Republic EAA (1995), acceded to the EU in 2004
 EAC Agreement Establishing an Association (1971), superseded by another Convention in 1976
 Estonia EAA (1998), acceded to the EU in 2004
 Greece AA (1961), acceded to the EU in 1981
 Hungary EAA (1994), acceded to the EU in 2004
 Latvia EAA (1998), acceded to the EU in 2004
 Lithuania EAA (1998), acceded to the EU in 2004
 Malta AA (1971), acceded to the EU in 2004
 Poland EAA (1994), acceded to the EU in 2004
 Romania EAA (1995), acceded to the EU in 2007
 Slovakia EAA (1995), acceded to the EU in 2004
 Slovenia EAA (1999), acceded to the EU in 2004
 United Kingdom ACR (1955), acceded to the EU in 1973

Free-trade agreements

In force

 Andorra CU (1991)
 Faroe Islands (autonomous constituent country of the Kingdom of Denmark) FTA (1997)
Japan EPA (2019)
 Mexico EPPCCA (2000)
 Monaco CU (1958)
 Palestinian Authority interim EMAA (1997)
 San Marino CCU (2002)
Singapore FTA (2019)
 South Korea FTA (2015)
 Switzerland FTA (1973)
 Vietnam FTA (2020)

Currently undergoing ratification

 Colombia and Peru FTA (signed in 2012)
 Canada CETA (signed in 2016)
 Cameroon Interim EPA (signed in 2009)
 CARIFORUM EPA (signed in 2008)
 Côte d'Ivoire Stepping Stone EPA (signed in 2009)
 EAC EPA (signed in 2016)
 Ecuador FTA (signed in 2016)
 Ghana Stepping Stone EPA (signed in 2016)
 Madagascar, Mauritius, the Seychelles, and Zimbabwe Interim EPA (signed in 2009)
 SADC EPA (signed in 2016)

Currently in negotiations
 Australia FTA
 India FTA
 Malaysia FTA
 Morocco DCFTA
 New Zealand FTA
 Philippines FTA
 Thailand FTA
 Tunisia DCFTA
 United States TTIP
 APC Pacific EPA
 ASEAN FTA (negotiations paused in 2009, in favour of bilateral negotiations with individual states)
 ECOWAS EPA (finalised in February 2014, but not signed)
 Central Africa states EPA
 GCC FTA (negotiations suspended by GCC in 2008)

Other agreements

 Andorra CA (2005)
 Armenia CEPA (2021)
 ASEAN CA (1980), valid only for Indonesia, Malaysia, the Philippines, Singapore and Thailand.
 Azerbaijan PCA (1999)
 GCC CA (1989)
 Indonesia ACPC (2014)
 Iraq PCA (2018)
 Kazakhstan Enhanced PCA (2020)
 Kyrgyzstan PCA (1999)
 Moldova PCA (1998)
 Mongolia ATEC (1993)
 Mongolia ACPC (2017)
 Papua New Guinea Interim PA (2011)
 Philippines PCA (2018)
 Russia PCA (1997)
 Tajikistan PCA (2010)
 Ukraine PCA (1998)
 USSR TCA (1989), endorsed by Tajikistan in 1994 and by Turkmenistan
 Uzbekistan PCA (1999)
 Vietnam ACPC (2016)
 Yemen CA (1998)

Currently undergoing ratification
 Belarus PCA (signed in 1995)
 Fiji Interim PA (signed in 2009)
 New Zealand PARC (signed in 2016)
 Turkmenistan PCA (signed in 1998)

Currently in negotiations
 Malaysia PCA
 Russia (negotiations suspended in 2014)
 Singapore PCA
 Thailand PCA
 Uzbekistan Enhanced PCA

Defunct agreements

 Albania ATCEC (1992), superseded by SAA in 2009
 Algeria CA (1978), superseded by EMAA in 2005
 Armenia PCA (1999), superseded by CEPA in 2021
 Egypt CA (1978), superseded by EMAA in 2004
 Georgia PCA (1999), superseded by AA in 2016
 Kazakhstan PCA (1999) superseded by EPCA in 2020
 Macedonia CA (1998), superseded by SAA in 2004
 Mexico CA (1991), superseded by EPPCCA in 2000
 Morocco CA (1978), superseded by EMAA in 2000
 Serbia FA FRY-EU (2000)
 Tunisia CA (1978), superseded by EMAA in 1998
 Vietnam CA (1996) superseded by ACPC in 2016

Legend

AA = Agreement Establishing an Association/Association Agreement
ACPC = Agreement on Comprehensive Partnership and Cooperation
ACR = Agreement concerning the relations
ATDC = Agreement on Trade, Development and Cooperation
CEPA = Comprehensive and Enhanced Partnership Agreement
CETA = Comprehensive Economic and Trade Agreement
CA = Cooperation Agreement
CCU = Agreement on Cooperation and Customs Union
CU = Customs Union
DCFTA = Deep and Comprehensive Free Trade Agreement
EPA = Economic Partnership Agreement
EPPCCA = Economic Partnership, Political Coordination and Cooperation Agreement
EAA = Europe Agreement Establishing an Association
EEA = European Economic Area
EMAA = Euro-Mediterranean Agreement Establishing an Association
FTA = Free Trade Agreement
PA = Partnership Agreement
PCA = Partnership and Cooperation Agreement/Agreement on Partnership and Cooperation
PARC = Partnership Agreement on Relations and Cooperation
SAA = Stabilisation and Association Agreement
ATCEC = Agreement on Trade and Commercial and Economic Cooperation
ATEC = Agreement on Trade and Economic Cooperation
TTIP = Transatlantic Trade and Investment Partnership

Impact on environment and national economies

Agriculture & Manufacturing
Trade agreements between the EU and other countries or free trade zones have differential effects on the respective economies. Agricultural industries are most significantly impacted when regional farms have to compete with large producers that gain access to markets when tariffs fall. For large agreements such as the AA with Mercosur, significant opposition exists in European countries against cheaper imports of meats and other products. However, for the manufacturing sector of cars and industrial products for export, usually involving larger global corporations, relevant volume increases are obvious for the more industrialised trade members.

Environment 
The impact on the environment for those nations that export farm products from areas with rain forests or other ecologically relevant regions, for example in Brazil, has been increasingly documented by environmental groups opposing EU trade agreements. In addition, other industries with large environmental impact such as mining are expanding in areas where the regulatory burden is low, for example in South America and Asia. Industry groups have argued that increased economic performance in those sectors will only strengthen standards in participating nations, and that EU trade agreements should go hand in hand with harmonisation efforts for environmental regulations.

See also
 European Union free trade agreements
 Stability Pact for South Eastern Europe
 Free trade areas in Europe
 EU-ACP Economic Partnership Agreements
 Future enlargement of the European Union

Notes

References

External links
 Free trade agreements
 EU free trade agreements
 Council of the European Union Agreements and conventions database
 European External Action Service Treaties Office Database
 EU Neighbourhood Info Centre
 EU Neighbourhood Library

Lists of treaties